Aulus Egnatius Priscillianus (c. 135 - 1??) was a Roman philosopher.

Family
He married and had Lucius Egnatius Victor, Quintus Egnatius Proculus, and possibly, speculatively, also Aulus Egnatius Proculus, as sons.

He is also thought to be related to Marcus Egnatius Marcellinus and Marcus Egnatius Postumus.

References
 Christian Settipani. Continuité gentilice et continuité sénatoriale dans les familles sénatoriales romaines à l'époque impériale, 2000

2nd-century Romans
2nd-century philosophers
Priscillianus, Aulus